Wang Hsi-jui (25 July 1930 – 1 June 2016), known by his stage name Wang Jui, was a Taiwanese actor.  He won the Golden Bell Award three times. Wang died in Taipei of heart and lung failure on 1 June 2016 at the age of 85.

Selected filmography
A Touch of Zen (1971)
Eat Drink Man Woman (1994)
Super Citizen Ko (1995)
Island of Greed (1997)

References

External links

2016 deaths
Taiwanese male film actors
Taiwanese male television actors
1930 births
Taiwanese people from Shandong